Hugh Conway  (2 February 1819 – 23 April 1893) was an Irish prelate who served as Bishop of Killala.

He was born in Ballycroy, County Mayo. Conwy was ordained priest on 22 September 1842. Conway was appointed titular bishop of Achantus on 21 November 1871; and diocesan bishop of Killala on 9 June 1873.

References

Roman Catholic bishops of Killala
19th-century Roman Catholic bishops in Ireland
1819 births
1893 deaths
People from County Mayo